There are a number of lists of fictional species:

Extraterrestrial
List of fictional extraterrestrials (by media type)
Lists of fictional alien species: A, B, C, D, E, F, G, H, I, J, K, L, M, N, O, P, Q, R, S, T, U, V, W, X, Y, Z

Humanoid
Lists of humanoids
Literature
Comics
Television
Film
Video games
Paleoanthropological hoaxes
Cardiff giant
Nebraska man
Piltdown man
Freak show
Humanzee

Legendary
List of legendary creatures
List of legendary creatures by type
List of giants in mythology and folklore
Vampire folklore by region

Mythical
Legendary creatures of the Argentine Northwest region
Mythical creatures in Burmese folklore
List of Greek mythological creatures
List of legendary creatures from Japan
List of Philippine mythological creatures
Supernatural beings in Slavic folklore

Plants and fungi
 List of fictional plants

Reptilian
 List of dragons
 List of dragons in mythology and folklore
 List of dragons in literature
 List of dragons in popular culture
 List of dragons in film and television
 List of dragons in games
 List of fictional dinosaurs

Theological
List of fictional angels
List of fictional demons